White Lady is a 2006 Filipino supernatural horror-drama film directed by Jeff Tan. It is Tan's first feature length film as he worked mostly on music videos.

Plot
Two best friends from Iloilo, Pearl and Jonathan, arrive in Manila to study at an Arts Academy. Jonathan himself secretly harbors romantic feelings for Pearl, known for her brilliance and wisdom. Upon enrollment, a clique of students led by Mimi and her right-hand person Eva, takes an interest in them. Mimi is a pretty, rich, and popular girl who gets her way by bullying others. The clique also consists of basketball jock Joshua, film and photography major Jowee, and delinquent band frontman Hector.

Mimi takes Pearl and Jonathan into her fold, befriending them in exchange for academic favors from the bright and studious Pearl. However, Pearl rebuffs the clique after realizing their deceptions, while Jonathan joins a prominent fraternity. Soon after, Pearl and Jonathan's close friendship becomes estranged.

One night, Pearl experiences strange paranormal occurrences on campus and has visions of a woman in white, referred to as the White Lady, singing a folk lullaby. She and Jonathan learn from others about the story of a White Lady rumored to have frequented the school grounds. Jonathan catches up with Pepo, who is building a new storage shed; Pepo reveals that the original storage shed burned down and adds of seeing a vision of the said woman at the same spot of the shed. The next day, Pearl meets and befriends Tasya, a kindhearted Guimaras-born elderly woman residing in a house situated on the Academy's vast campus. Tasya tells the story of her granddaughter Christina, a simple girl who was reportedly driven into hiding by Mimi’s pompousness. Pearl immediately feels an affinity towards Christina since both girls have been receiving Mimi's scorn. Throughout the film, Tasya talks with Christina, whose face is not shown until the climax. 

The haunting worsens when Pearl lands the highly coveted lead role in the school play, which also earns her the brunt of Mimi’s ire since the latter wanted the part for herself. In another circumstance, a burgeoning relationship begins to kindle between Pearl and Robbie, the rich, athletic, and most popular guy in school, whom Mimi also desires.

Flashbacks show Christina's story. Robbie befriends her after rescuing her from bullies and Mimi's gang. The two begin a relationship that his father opposes and forces them to separate and have Robbie choose Mimi. Soon after, Mimi's friends begin to torment her frequently. Christina shuns Robbie after having her way by his and the gang's actions. After the gang imprisons her in a storage shed, Mimi drugs a janitor to silence him and Robbie, under her influence, murders Christina by setting the shed on fire.

In a series of intense ghostly appearances, the White Lady manifests herself to the clique, letting them experience her wrath. Each clique member is either killed or left mutilated out of trauma.

Pearl receives news during a Halloween feast that her mother has leukemia and reveals to Robbie that she is returning to Iloilo. Robbie grows overzealous and disoriented after seeing Christina's vision on his cellphone. Pearl escapes to a gypsy tent, wherein she encounters a vision that relives Christina's final moments. From here, she learns of Robbie's crime and shuns Robbie.

Robbie captures Pearl and drags her to the storage shed. Jonathan witnesses this and intervenes, only to be subdued by Robbie. To try and silence them, Robbie sets the shed on fire and flees the scene on a motorcycle. The White Lady, now revealed to be Christina, appears and causes him to crash. He runs to a carillon wherein bells play the lullaby, and Christina causes Robbie to fall to his death. Pearl and Jonathan manage to survive and escape the shed fire unharmed due to Christina's soul diverting the flames. Later on, Christina walks to a light in an empty field, presumably the gate of Heaven.

Sometime later, Pearl returns to Iloilo and visits Tasya, wherein the former reveals that her mother has died of the ailment. As Tasya reveals that she sees Christina's soul departing for the afterlife in peace, Pearl states that they vow to care for each other despite their losses. While the two comfort each other, Christina's voice sings her lullaby as she and God gaze down on Tasya and Pearl from Heaven in the form of wind and sunlight.

Cast

Main characters
 Boots Anson-Roa as Lola Tasya, Christina's grandmother, who hails from Guimaras. Tasya is a kind and loving woman who cares about her granddaughter. She has visions of Christina in scenes involving her.
 Angelica Panganiban as Christina/White Lady, a kind and intelligent girl from Western Visayas who becomes the titular character as part of her revenge quest following her murder in the hands of a clique that belittled her
 Pauleen Luna as Pearl, a Voice Major student from Iloilo
 JC de Vera as Robbie, a popular student who becomes Pearl's boyfriend. He is also revealed to be the former boyfriend of Christina and eventually, her murderer.
 Gian Carlos as Jonathan, a close friend of Pearl who also hails from Iloilo

The Clique
 Iwa Moto as Mimi, the leader of the clique who is notorious for bullying others. She is killed by shattered mirror shards in a dressing room during a concert's premiere.
 Ketchup Eusebio as Hector, a member of the clique who is a known band frontman. He is the first member to be killed following his fall to a pit wherein he is suffocated by rats when he encounters the titular character dissolving to rodents
 Jason Abalos as Joshua, another member of the clique. He falls from Mimi's bedroom window and becomes amputated after a possessed doll chases him but it is unknown if he was killed or he survived.
 Katarina Perez as Eva, Mimi's right hand person and the second-in-command of the clique. She is killed after the entity severs her arm with broken glass as she attempts to escape a painting studio.
 Glaiza de Castro as Jowee, a photography major student and another member of the clique. She becomes hyperventilated after the titular character appears in a darkroom and blinds her with flashes but survives.

Other characters
 Franzen Fajardo as Kuya Pepo
 Nanding Josef as Mang Jani
 Malou Crisologo as Professor Barredo
 Ricci Chan as Professor Alfredo
 Emil Sandoval as Robert, Sr.
 Minnie Aguilar as Ate Teri

Production
Principal photography of the film was done within the University of the Philippines Los Baños campus.

See also
 List of ghost films

References

External links
 Official website
 

2006 horror films
2006 films
Philippine horror films
2000s Tagalog-language films
Visayan-language films
Regal Entertainment films